Eógan of Strathclyde may refer to:

Owain ap Dyfnwal (fl. 934), King of the Cumbrians
Owain ap Dyfnwal (died 1015), King of the Cumbrians
Owain Foel (fl. 1018), King of the Cumbrians